The Faucher River is a tributary of Tessier Lake (Gouin Reservoir) located on the southwestern side of the Gouin Reservoir. This river runs in the town of La Tuque, in the administrative region of Mauricie, in Quebec, in Canada.

The Faucher River flows successively into the townships of Buies, Provancher and Faucher. Forestry is the main economic activity of this valley; recreational tourism activities, secondly thanks to the Canadian National Railway which passes on the south shore of Tessier Lake (Gouin Reservoir) and on the South shore of Lac Duchamp where the village of Clova, Quebec.

The route 404, connecting the village of Clova, Quebec to the South Bay of Bureau Lake (Gouin Reservoir) serves the south of Lake Duchamp and the West of Tessier Lake (Gouin Reservoir); this road connects to the south-east the road 400 which goes to Gouin Dam. Some secondary forest roads are in use nearby for forestry and recreational tourism activities.

The surface of the Faucher River is usually frozen from mid-November to the end of April, however, safe ice circulation is generally from early December to late March.

Geography

Toponymy 
The term "Faucher" refers to a family name of French origin. In this sector, the term "Faucher" is associated with the township, the lake and the river.

The toponym "Faucher River" was formalized on December 5, 1968 at the Commission de toponymie du Québec, when it was created.

Notes and references

See also 

Rivers of Mauricie
Tributaries of the Saint-Maurice River
La Tuque, Quebec